Hajime Matsui (born 30 March 1954) is a Japanese professional golfer.

Matsui played on the Japan Golf Tour, winning twice.

Professional wins (2)

Japan Golf Tour wins (2)

External links

Japanese male golfers
Japan Golf Tour golfers
1954 births
Living people